Colin Abel Jeavons (born 20 October 1929) is a retired British television actor.

Career
Jeavons' earliest television role was as Jules Neraud in an episode of the 1956 anthology series of teleplays Nom-de-Plume. Broadcast live, it is unknown if any recordings of the production exist. He began an association with Dickens productions on BBC Television in 1959 with Bleak House as Richard Carstone, and Great Expectations (for the first time) as Herbert Pocket. The same year he played Prince Hal/Henry V in the BBC's The Life and Death of Sir John Falstaff. In 1963 he played the extremely reluctant hero Vadassy forced into espionage in Epitaph for a Spy for BBC Television.

Jeavons portrayed Uriah Heep in the BBC's David Copperfield (1966).  Only one episode featuring him (episode 11, "Umble Aspirations") is known to exist. He appeared in a host of 1960s and 1970s TV programmes including Doctor Who (in "The Underwater Menace"), Adam Adamant Lives! as a murderous fashion designer, as the undertaker Shadrack in Billy Liar (1973), as businessman Leonard Gold in The Sweeney (in the 1978 episode "The Bigger They Are"), as shop owner Ellery in Shoestring in the episode "Where Was I?" (1980) and The Avengers (in "A Touch of Brimstone" and "The Winged Avenger"). Pete Stampede and Alan Hayes wrote of Jeavons in the latter series as "one of those under-rated, ever-present supporting actors who never turn in a bad performance." On children's TV, he hosted Play School for a time, and read "The Black Vicar" on Jackanory.  He also appeared in the 1981 Doctor Who spin-off K-9 and Company, and he narrated two BBC children's animated series, namely Barnaby and Joe.

He appeared in the Play For Today production of David Edgar's play about British neo-Nazis, Destiny (1978). The same year he played the part of Mr Johnson, a schoolteacher, in Peter McDougall's BBC supernatural drama Tarry-Dan Tarry-Dan Scarey Old Spooky Man. He appeared as Samson Brass in another BBC Dickens production, The Old Curiosity Shop (1979), and in another version of Great Expectations (1981), this time as Wemmick. The same year he played a recurring UFO-obsessed character in the sci-fi comedy Kinvig. His most critically acclaimed role during this period was as the neglected and abused child, Donald, in Dennis Potter's Blue Remembered Hills (1979).

In the 1980s, he was involved with two dramatisations of Sherlock Holmes stories.  He played "with chilling authority" in the words of writer David Stuart Davies, Professor Moriarty in The Baker Street Boys (1982), and "with great panache" Inspector Lestrade in the Granada Television series The Adventures of Sherlock Holmes (featuring Jeremy Brett as Holmes). Producer Michael Cox of the Granada Television series stated frankly that they were given the best Lestrade of his generation. In the 1981 TV production of The Hitchhiker's Guide to the Galaxy, he portrayed Max Quordlepleen, an entertainer who hosts at Milliways, the Restaurant at the End of the Universe.

Jeavons was Briggs, the lawyer who halts the marriage between Jane and Rochester, in a BBC version of Jane Eyre (1983). In 1984, he played the existentialist philosopher Søren Kierkegaard in the "Prometheus Unbound" episode of Don Cupitt's Sea of Faith for BBC. The following year he played Adolf Hitler in Hitler's SS: Portrait in Evil. He played the solicitor Vholes in another BBC adaptation of Bleak House in 1985. In 1986 he was seen in Paradise Postponed.

Jeavons featured in the 1990 television drama House of Cards by Michael Dobbs, as Tim Stamper, Tory Whip and ally of Ian Richardson's Francis Urquhart. The character returned - promoted initially to Chief Whip, then to Party Chairman - in the 1993 sequel, To Play the King. Jeavons played Del Boy's lawyer, Solly Atwell, in Only Fools And Horses. He also played the role of Genrikh Yagoda in the 1992 television film Stalin.

Jeavons also appeared in many films over the years, often as priests or vicars. These included roles in The Devil's Daffodil (1961), Frankenstein Created Woman (1967), The Other People (1968), The Oblong Box (1969), The Games (1970), Bartleby (1970), Diagnosis: Murder (1975), Schizo (1976), The Island (1980), The French Lieutenant's Woman (1981), Absolute Beginners (1986) and Secret Friends (1991). Jeavons retired from acting in 1993; his final role was a reprise of Tim Stamper in To Play the King.

Personal life
Jeavons' elder son Barney managed the British rock band Reuben, and in 2007 Jeavons emerged from retirement, heavily bearded, to appear as the enigmatic General in Reuben's Rock video "Blood, Bunny, Larkhall". In a behind-the-scenes short, Jeavons explained briefly some of the highlights of his acting career. Barney Jeavons is the former Arts Centre Director of the West End Centre in Aldershot.

References

Bibliography
 Starring Sherlock Holmes, David Stuart Davies; Titan Books 2001

External links
 
 The Avengers TV Forever

1929 births
Living people
English male television actors
BBC television presenters
People from Newport, Wales
20th-century English male actors
Welsh actors